Elie Amsini Kiswaya (August 25, 1928 – December 11, 2008) was a Congolese bishop of the Roman Catholic Diocese of Sakania–Kipushi of the Democratic Republic of the Congo from March 5, 1977 until December 21, 2001.  He was succeeded by Bishop Gaston Kashala Ruwezi. Kiswaya died on December 11, 2008 at the age of 80.

External links 
 Catholic Hierarchy: Bishop Elie Amsini Kiswaya †

1928 births
2008 deaths
20th-century Roman Catholic bishops in the Democratic Republic of the Congo
21st-century Roman Catholic bishops in the Democratic Republic of the Congo
Roman Catholic bishops of Sakania–Kipushi
21st-century Democratic Republic of the Congo people